Cité internationale universitaire de Paris (CiuP, Cité U) is a private park and foundation located in Paris, France. Since 1925, it has provided general and public services, including the maintenance of several dozen residences housing around 6,000 students and visiting academics in the Île-de-France region. Officially recognized as a foundation of public interest, the CIUP promotes exchanges between students from around the world in a spirit of tolerance.

History
The CIUP was established after World War I by André Honnorat, rector at the Sorbonne, in cooperation with Émile Deutsch de la Meurthe, in order to create a meeting place for students, researchers and intellectuals from around the world in a spirit of peace, unity and friendly cooperation. The CIUP was originally built for the University of Paris, hence its name appears in several of its buildings, notably the Maison Internationale.

Several CIUP structures have been designed by architects of note, such as Le Corbusier, Willem Marinus Dudok, Heydar Ghiai and Claude Parent. The residences are organized mostly by nationality, although residents in each maison are not necessarily from the countries implied by building names. Up to 30%-50% of the student residents in each residence may come from different nationalities. In 2006, students of 132 different nationalities lived in the Cité Internationale. In the early 21st century, the CIUP acquired two residences outside its original perimeter, in the 19th arrondissement of Paris.

Location
Located in the 14th arrondissement of Paris, the CIUP is bounded to the south by the Boulevard Périphérique, the busy ring road encircling Paris, and to the north (in part) by the 38-acre Parc Montsouris.

Residences

Former residents 

 Marcos Aguinis (Fondation Argentine)
 Joaquim Pedro de Andrade (Maison du Brésil)
 Azorin (Collège d'Espagne)
 Miguel Angel
 Pol Pot, (Indochinese Pavilion, now the Maison de l’Asie du sud-est)
 Fernando Arrabal (Collège d'Espagne)
 Pío Baroja (Collège d'Espagne)
 Raymond Barre
 Steven James Bartlett (Maison du Mexique)
 Manuel Bartlett Díaz (Maison du Mexique)
 Tahar Ben Jelloun (Maison de Norvège)
 Malcolm Bilson (Fondation des États-Unis)
 Karen Blixen (Fondation Danoise)
 Habib Bourguiba
 Josep Puig i Cadafalch (Collège d'Espagne)
 Michel Camdessus
 Cuauhtémoc Cárdenas (Maison du Mexique)
 Américo Castro (Collège d'Espagne)
 Luis Cernuda (Collège d'Espagne)
 Aimé Césaire
 Georges Charpak
 Inger Christensen
 Adrienne Clarkson (Maison des étudiants canadiens)
 Julio Cortázar (Fondation Argentine)
 Michèle Cotta
 Jean-Louis Curtis
 Fernando del Paso (Maison du Mexique)
 Georges Descrières
 Abdou Diouf (Résidence Lucien Paye)
   Laurent Dispot (Collège Franco-Britannique)
  Jean Dries (Fondation Deutsch de la Meurthe)
 Miguel Angel Estrella (Fondation Argentine)
 Manuel Felguérez (Maison du Mexique)
 Bruno Leonardo Gelber (Fondation Argentine)
 Margo Glantz (Maison du Mexique)
 Claude Guéant (Maison de l'Inde)
 Paul Guth
 Yves Hernot (College Franco-Britannique)
 Michel Jobert
 Roméo LeBlanc (Maison des Etudiants Canadiens)
 Jules Léger (Maison des Etudiants Canadiens)
 Jaime Lerner (Maison du Brésil)
 Henri Lopes (Résidence Lucien Paye)
 Neil MacGregor (Collège Franco-Britannique)
 Louis Mermaz
 Patrick Modiano
 Arthur Moreira Lima (Maison du Brésil)
 Porfirio Muñoz Ledo (Maison du Mexique)
 Paul Nizan
 Severo Ochoa (Collège d'Espagne)
 Akram Ojjeh
 Farah Diba Pahlavi (Collège Néerlandais)
 Rajendra Prasad (Maison de l'Inde)
 Francisco Rezek (Maison du Brésil)
 Sebastião Salgado (Maison du Brésil)
 Jacques Santer (Fondation Biermans-Lapôtre)
 Jean-Paul Sartre
 Léopold Sédar Senghor (Fondation Deutsch de la Meurthe)
 Antoni Tàpies (Collège d'Espagne)
 Serge Tchuruk (Maison des Etudiants Arméniens)
 Francisco Toledo (Maison du Mexique)
 Pierre Elliott Trudeau (Maison des Etudiants Canadiens)
 Zuenir Ventura (Maison du Brésil)
 Luc Vinet (Maison des Etudiants Canadiens)
 Narciso Yepes (Collège d'Espagne)

See also 
Marcel Gaumont Sculptor of relief on university entrance

References

Notes

Bibliography 
 Dzovinar Kévonian et Guillaume Tronchet (ed.), La Babel étudiante. La Cité internationale universitaire de Paris (1920-1950), Presses universitaires de Rennes, 2013 . (online)
 Dzovinar Kévonian et Guillaume Tronchet (dir.), Le Campus-monde. La Cité internationale universitaire de Paris, de 1945 aux années 2000), Presses universitaires de Rennes, 2022, 336 p. (online)
 Guillaume Tronchet, André Honnorat. Un visionnaire en politique, Hémisphères éditions, 2020, 448 p.
 Guillaume Tronchet, "Diplomatie universitaire ou diplomatie culturelle? La Cité internationale universitaire de Paris entre deux rives (1920-1940)", dans Dzovinar Kévonian et Guillaume Tronchet (dir.), La Babel étudiante. La Cité internationale universitaire de Paris (1920-1950), Rennes, PUR, 2013, p. 59-88 (online)
 Guillaume Tronchet, « La Cité universitaire : une joint-venture transnationale dans le Paris des années 1920 et 1930 », in Serge Jaumain et Pierre Van den Dungen (dir), Biermans-Lapôtre. Histoire d’un mécène et de sa fondation, Bruxelles, Lannoo/Racine Editions, 2013, p. 85-100.

External links 

Cité Internationale Universitaire de Paris – official website

Homepages for each house
 Indian house
 Swedish house
 House of the Canadian Students (Maison des étudiants canadiens)
 Fondation des États-Unis 
 Fondation Suisse
 Brazil house
 Maison de la Tunisie
 Maison du Liban
 Mexican house
 Japanese house
 Fondation de l'Allemagne — Maison Heinrich Heine
 Spanish house 

Buildings and structures in Paris
Education in Paris
Educational institutions established in 1925
University and college residential buildings
Buildings and structures in the 14th arrondissement of Paris
Residential buildings in France
1925 establishments in France